Martin Thomas may refer to:

 Martin Thomas, Baron Thomas of Gresford (born 1937), British Liberal Democrat politician
 Martin Thomas (cricketer) (born 1952), former English cricketer
 Martin Thomas (footballer, born 1959), Welsh football player and goalkeeping coach
 Martin Thomas (historian) (born 1964), British historian
 Martin Thomas (footballer, born 1973), English football player
 Martin Thomas (canoeist), French slalom canoeist

See also
 Martyn Thomas (born 1948), British software engineer
 Martyn Thomas (rugby player) (born 1987), Welsh rugby union player
 Thomas Martin (disambiguation)